Giampietro Perrulli (born 8 June 1985) is an Italian footballer who plays as a winger for Totti Sporting.

Career
Perrulli started his career at Roman club Ostia Mare at Serie D. In January 2004 he was signed by Serie A team Udinese Calcio. However, he only played in its under-20 team, including a youth friendly as fullback.

Ascoli
In July 2005 he was signed by Ascoli. He also sold to Udinese (another "white-black" striped) in co-ownership deal on 31 August 2005. Before that deal Ascoli already agreed a loan deal to Sambenedettese, a town not far away from Ascoli Piceno. Perrulli played his first Serie A match on 14 May 2006 against Empoli F.C., after he returned to Ascoli Piceno in January 2006, which Ascoli also bought the remain 50% half from Udine. In the next season, he played 27 matches with only 8 start. He followed the team relegated to 2007–08 Serie B, played another 14 Serie B match with only two starts. That matches were on 25 September 2007 against Vicenza as a winger and on 26 January 2008 against Piacenza as a second forward.

Vicenza
In January 2008, he was signed by Vicenza along with Michelangelo Minieri. Ascoli got Evangelos Nastos in exchange and retained 50% registration on Perrulli.

After played nil at 2008–09 season, he was loaned to Pescara in January 2009. In June 2009 Vicenza gave up the remain 50% rights to Ascoli. In January 2010 he left for Perugia. Perrulli was trailed at A.S. Andria BAT in October 2010.

Carpi
On 2 September 2011 he was re-signed by Carpi after the 6-month deal expired.

Novara
On 31 January 2019, he was transferred to Novara. On 2 September 2019, his contract was dissolved by mutual consent.

Totti Sporting
In the winter 2020, Perrulli joined Italian amateur club Totti Sporting.

References

External links
Profile at La Gazzetta dello Sport (2007–08)
 
 Lega Serie B Profile 

1985 births
Footballers from Rome
Living people
Italian footballers
Association football wingers
A.S. Ostia Mare Lido Calcio players
Udinese Calcio players
U.S. Viterbese 1908 players
Ascoli Calcio 1898 F.C. players
A.S. Sambenedettese players
L.R. Vicenza players
Delfino Pescara 1936 players
A.C. Perugia Calcio players
A.C. Carpi players
Lupa Roma F.C. players
U.S. Salernitana 1919 players
U.S. Cremonese players
Novara F.C. players
Serie A players
Serie B players
Serie C players
Serie D players